Built in 1926, the Arcade Building is a historic building in downtown Fort Pierce, Florida. It is located at 101 U.S. 1, North. Built in a Spanish Colonial Revival style, when built it was the largest commercial building in Fort Pierce. On October 12, 2001, the structure was listed on the U.S. National Register of Historic Places. The building was used for retail and office space until the 1980s when a fire damaged a third of the building. Since then the building was underused until the facade and the interior were restored in 2002. Its restoration was a major priority in the city's redevelopment.

References

External links 
 St. Lucie County listings at National Register of Historic Places
 Arcade Building at Florida's Office of Cultural and Historical Programs
The Arcade Building 360 tour

Fort Pierce, Florida
Buildings and structures in St. Lucie County, Florida
Retail buildings in Florida
Buildings and structures completed in 1926
National Register of Historic Places in St. Lucie County, Florida
Spanish Colonial Revival architecture in Florida